Fredrik Rosenquist  (born 30 April 1965) is a Swedish former tennis player.

Born in Malmö, Rosenquist's best performance on the Grand Prix tennis tour was in 1986 when he reached the second round of the Swedish Open where he lost to Emilio Sanchez. He also twice competed in the Austrian Open held in Kitzbühel.

Rosenquist has a career high ATP singles ranking of No. 356, achieved on 17 November 1986.

References

External links 
 

1965 births
Living people
Swedish male tennis players
Sportspeople from Malmö
20th-century Swedish people